Astyris rolani is a species of sea snail, a marine gastropod mollusc in the family Columbellidae, the dove snails.

Description

Distribution

References

External links

Columbellidae
Gastropods described in 2004